Barry Salman (born May 20, 1940) is an American politician who served in the New York City Council 1970 to 1977.

References

1940 births
Living people
New York City Council members
New York (state) Democrats